Horndon may refer to the following places:

Horndon, Devon, a location in England
Horndon railway station, Essex, England
Horndon-on-the-Hill, a village in Essex, England
Horndon mint, a mint 
West Horndon, a village in Essex, England
East Horndon, a village in Essex, England
Darfield, New Zealand, formerly Horndon Junction